= National Plant Hire Guide =

- Company type: Private
- Industry: Publishing
- Founded: 1961
- Headquarters: London, United Kingdom
- Website: www.planthireguide.co.uk

National Plant Hire Guide was first published in 1961 and was quickly established as the leading directory for the UK Plant Hire Industry. Claims to be the most comprehensive guide to hire companies across the UK. The print version of the Guide is published twice a year and is currently on its 109rd edition (Jan 2017). The National Plant Hire website list some 500+ categories for over 50 different UK counties.
